Spotswood is a borough in Middlesex County, in the U.S. state of New Jersey. The community is nestled within the heart of the Raritan Valley region, with the Manalapan Brook and Matchaponix Brook forming the confluence of the South River (a Raritan River tributary) inside the borough. As of the 2020 United States census, the borough's population was 8,163, a decrease of 94 (−1.1%) from the 2010 census count of 8,257, which in turn reflected an increase of 377 (+4.8%) from the 7,880 counted at the 2000 census.

History 

Its first settler James Johnston originally called the place "Spottiswoode", named for his old place of residence in Scotland, and dates back to its original settlement in 1685. It was also historically spelled Spottswood.

The Bordentown and South Amboy Turnpike, a stagecoach route built in 1816, passed through Spotswood.
The Camden and Amboy Railroad, chartered in 1830, followed this stagecoach route and reached Spotswood in 1832. It used stone sleepers to support the track. The locomotive, John Bull, operated on the railroad. A trackside memorial is located near East Spotswood Park. In addition to the Spotswood station, Outcalt and East Spotswood had passenger and freight stations on the Pennsylvania Railroad, the United New Jersey Railroad and Canal Company subsidiary.

Spotswood was incorporated as a borough by an act of the New Jersey Legislature on April 15, 1908, from portions of East Brunswick Township, based on the passage of a referendum held on May 12, 1908.

Geography
According to the United States Census Bureau, the borough had a total area of 2.42 square miles (6.26 km2), including 2.31 square miles (5.98 km2) of land and 0.11 square miles (0.28 km2) of water (4.46%).

Unincorporated communities, localities and place names located partially or completely within the borough include Outcalt, which is located along the border of Spotswood and Monroe Township.

The borough borders the Middlesex County municipalities of East Brunswick, Helmetta, Monroe Township and Old Bridge Township.

Demographics

2010 census

The Census Bureau's 2006–2010 American Community Survey showed that (in 2010 inflation-adjusted dollars) median household income was $70,360 (with a margin of error of +/− $9,861) and the median family income was $90,652 (+/− $8,741). Males had a median income of $59,226 (+/− $4,823) versus $43,365 (+/− $4,935) for females. The per capita income for the borough was $31,249 (+/− $1,696). About 2.5% of families and 3.3% of the population were below the poverty line, including 0.7% of those under age 18 and 6.4% of those age 65 or over.

2000 census
As of the 2000 United States census there were 7,880 people, 3,099 households, and 2,163 families residing in the borough. The population density was 3,389.8 people per square mile (1,311.4/km2). There were 3,158 housing units at an average density of 1,358.5 per square mile (525.6/km2). The racial makeup of the borough was 99.24% White, .05% African American, .5% Asian, 0.01% Pacific Islander, and 0.20% from two or more races. Hispanic or Latino of any race were 4.38% of the population.

There were 3,099 households, out of which 29.4% had children under the age of 18 living with them, 57.0% were married couples living together, 9.1% had a female householder with no husband present, and 30.2% were non-families. 26.5% of all households were made up of individuals, and 15.6% had someone living alone who was 65 years of age or older. The average household size was 2.54 and the average family size was 3.10.

In the borough the population was spread out, with 22.4% under the age of 18, 6.8% from 18 to 24, 30.1% from 25 to 44, 23.4% from 45 to 64, and 17.4% who were 65 years of age or older. The median age was 40 years. For every 100 females, there were 93.6 males. For every 100 females age 18 and over, there were 89.9 males.

The median income for a household in the borough was $55,833, and the median income for a family was $73,062. Males had a median income of $45,979 versus $35,859 for females. The per capita income for the borough was $25,247. About 2.6% of families and 4.3% of the population were below the poverty line, including 5.4% of those under age 18 and 2.9% of those age 65 or over.

Government

Local government
The Borough of Spotswood operates within the Faulkner Act (formally known as the Optional Municipal Charter Law of 1950) under the Mayor-Council (Plan B), implemented based on the recommendations of a Charter Study Commission as of July 1, 1976. The borough is one of 71 municipalities (of the 564) statewide that use this form of government. The governing body is comprised of the Mayor and the five-member Borough Council, who are chosen at-large to four-year terms of office on a non-partisan basis in elections held on a staggered basis in even-numbered years as part of the November general election. Three council seats are up for election together and two years later two council seats and the mayoral seat are up for vote. The mayor is the chief executive and has responsibility for the administration of the government. The legislative power resides solely within the borough council. There is separation of legislative and executive power in this form of government.

, the Mayor of Spotswood is Jackie Palmer whose term of office ends December 31, 2024. Members of the Borough Council are Council President William Lawrence "Larry" Kraemer (2022), Marylin Israel (2024), Edward A. Lesko (2024), Theodore Ricci (2022) and Charles Spicuzzo (2022).

In May 2015, Councilmember Frank LoSacco resigned from office from a term expiring in December 2016. In the November 2015 general election, Servis was elected to serve the balance of the term of office and was sworn in at the December 7, 2015, meeting after the election results were certified.

Citing potential savings of $25,000, Spotswood's council approved a measure in 2010 that would allow the borough to take advantage of new state legislation under which it would to shift its non-partisan municipal elections from May to the November general election, with the first municipal race taking place in November 2012. In the November 2012 general election, Nicholas Poliseno defeated Curtis Stollen in the mayoral race to succeed Thomas W. Barlow, who didn't run for re-election. Council incumbents Frank LoSacco and Edward T. Seely ran unopposed.

Law enforcement
The Spotswood Police Department is a 24/7 law enforcement agency that serves both Spotswood and Helmetta. The department has 22 officers, 3 full-time dispatchers, and 4 part-time dispatchers, led by Chief Michael Zarro. In April 2018, Helmetta disbanded its three-officer police force and entered into a six-year shared services agreement with Spotswood to provide police, dispatch and EMS services.

Federal, state and county representation
Spotswood is located in the 12th Congressional District and is part of New Jersey's 14th state legislative district. Prior to the 2011 reapportionment following the 2010 Census, Spotswood had been in the 18th state legislative district.

 

Middlesex County is governed by a Board of County Commissioners, whose seven members are elected at-large on a partisan basis to serve three-year terms of office on a staggered basis, with either two or three seats coming up for election each year as part of the November general election. At an annual reorganization meeting held in January, the board selects from among its members a commissioner director and deputy director. , Middlesex County's Commissioners (with party affiliation, term-end year, and residence listed in parentheses) are 
Commissioner Director Ronald G. Rios (D, Carteret, term as commissioner ends December 31, 2024; term as commissioner director ends 2022),
Commissioner Deputy Director Shanti Narra (D, North Brunswick, term as commissioner ends 2024; term as deputy director ends 2022),
Claribel A. "Clary" Azcona-Barber (D, New Brunswick, 2022),
Charles Kenny (D, Woodbridge Township, 2022),
Leslie Koppel (D, Monroe Township, 2023),
Chanelle Scott McCullum (D, Piscataway, 2024) and 
Charles E. Tomaro (D, Edison, 2023).
Constitutional officers are
County Clerk Nancy Pinkin (D, 2025, East Brunswick),
Sheriff Mildred S. Scott (D, 2022, Piscataway) and 
Surrogate Claribel Cortes (D, 2026; North Brunswick).

Politics
As of March 2011, there were a total of 5,119 registered voters in Spotswood, of which 1,485 (29.0%) were registered as Democrats, 965 (18.9%) were registered as Republicans and 2,667 (52.1%) were registered as Unaffiliated. There were 2 voters registered as either Libertarians or Greens.

In the 2012 presidential election, Republican Mitt Romney received 50.1% of the vote (1,764 cast), ahead of Democrat Barack Obama with 48.6% (1,712 votes), and other candidates with 1.4% (48 votes), among the 3,557 ballots cast by the borough's 5,177 registered voters (33 ballots were spoiled), for a turnout of 68.7%. In the 2008 presidential election, Republican John McCain received 52.4% of the vote (2,001 cast), ahead of Democrat Barack Obama with 45.4% (1,734 votes) and other candidates with 1.7% (64 votes), among the 3,820 ballots cast by the borough's 5,217 registered voters, for a turnout of 73.2%. In the 2004 presidential election, Republican George W. Bush received 55.4% of the vote (2,014 ballots cast), outpolling Democrat John Kerry with 43.4% (1,580 votes) and other candidates with 0.7% (34 votes), among the 3,638 ballots cast by the borough's 4,952 registered voters, for a turnout percentage of 73.5.

In the 2013 gubernatorial election, Republican Chris Christie received 70.2% of the vote (1,591 cast), ahead of Democrat Barbara Buono with 28.3% (640 votes), and other candidates with 1.5% (34 votes), among the 2,290 ballots cast by the borough's 5,254 registered voters (25 ballots were spoiled), for a turnout of 43.6%. In the 2009 gubernatorial election, Republican Chris Christie received 63.2% of the vote (1,627 ballots cast), ahead of Democrat Jon Corzine with 28.6% (736 votes), Independent Chris Daggett with 6.4% (165 votes) and other candidates with 1.2% (31 votes), among the 2,576 ballots cast by the borough's 5,043 registered voters, yielding a 51.1% turnout.

Education
The Spotswood Public Schools serve students in pre-kindergarten through twelfth grade. As of the 2020–21 school year, the district, comprised of four schools, had an enrollment of 1,610 students and 136.5 classroom teachers (on an FTE basis), for a student–teacher ratio of 11.8:1. Schools in the district (with 2020–21 enrollment data from the National Center for Education Statistics) are 
G. Austin Schoenly Elementary School with 207 students in grades Pre-K–1), 
E. Raymond Appleby Elementary School with 334 students in grades 2–5, 
Spotswood Memorial Middle School with 349 students in grades 6–8 and 
Spotswood High School with 692 students in grades 9–12.

Students from Helmetta, a non-operating district, attend school in Spotswood beginning in grammar school. Students from Milltown attend the high school as part of a sending/receiving relationship with the Milltown Public Schools.

Immaculate Conception Pre-School (toddler–Pre-K) and Immaculate Conception School (K–8), which opened in September 1960, operate under the supervision of Roman Catholic Diocese of Metuchen.

Parks and recreation

Tennis courts are located on Summerhill Road. Spotswood parks are located on Rieder Road, Mundy Avenue, Michael Road, and East Spotswood. A World War Two Memorial is located in the East Spotswood Park.

Transportation

Roads and highways

The main roads that pass through Spotswood include Middlesex County Route 613 (Devoe Avenue / Main Street / Summerhill Road) connecting Monroe Township to the south and East Brunswick Township to the north and Middlesex County Route 615 (Manalapan Road / Main Street) connecting Helmetta in the southwest to East Brunswick Township in the borough's northwest corner.

Both Route 18 and County Route 527 just miss the borough by less than a mile. The closest limited access road is the New Jersey Turnpike (Interstate 95) which is accessible in both neighboring East Brunswick Township (Exit 9) and bordering Monroe Township (Exit 8A).

Public transportation
NJ Transit provides bus service between the borough and the Port Authority Bus Terminal in Midtown Manhattan on the 138 route.

References

External links

 Spotswood Borough website
 Spotswood Public Schools
 
 School Data for the Spotswood Public Schools, National Center for Education Statistics
 Spotswood Volunteer Fire Department
 

 
1908 establishments in New Jersey
Boroughs in Middlesex County, New Jersey
Faulkner Act (mayor–council)
Populated places established in 1908